Fetish may refer to:

Anthropological uses
 Fetishism, the attribution of religious or mystical qualities to inanimate objects, known as fetishes
 Zuni fetishes, small carvings from various stones made by the Zuni Indians
 Imiut fetish, in ancient Egypt a stuffed, headless animal skin tied by the tail to a pole
 Fetish priest, in countries of West Africa, a person who serves as a mediator between the spirit and the living

Sexual
 Sexual fetishism, a sexual attraction to objects or body parts of lesser sexual importance (or none at all) such as feet, toes or certain types of clothing
 Racial fetishism
 Fetish subculture, a social movement constructed around sexual fetishism
 Fetish magazine, a type of erotic magazine
 Fetish art
 List of fetish artists
 Fetish fashion
 List of paraphilias

Arts
 Fetish (album), a 1999 album by Joan Jett and the Blackhearts
 "Fetish" (song), a 2017 song by Selena Gomez
 Fetish, a fictional superheroine in the Bomb Queen series
 The Great Fetish, a science fiction novel by L. Sprague de Camp

Business
 Commodity fetishism, a Marxist concept of valuation in capitalist markets
 Venturi Fétish, a car produced by Venturi Automobilesiguation
 Growth Fetish, a 2003 book by Clive Hamilton advocating a zero-growth economy among "developed" nations